The Hollywood Music in Media Award for Best Original Score in an Independent Film is one of the awards given annually to people working in the motion picture industry by the Hollywood Music in Media Awards (HMMA).

History

It is presented to the composers who have composed the best "original" score, written specifically for an independent film. The award was first given in 2015, during the sixth annual awards. It was first awarded to independent short film, but gradually shifted to full-length features.

Winners and nominees

2010s

2020s

References

Best Score in an Independent Film
Film awards for best score
Awards established in 2014